Jarrid Geduld (born 13 January 1990), is a South African actor. He is best known for his roles in the popular films 10,000 BC, Ellen: Die storie van Ellen Pakkies and Boy Called Twist.

Personal life
He was born on 13 January 1990 in South Africa.

Career
In 2004, he made film debut with the film Boy Called Twist and played the titular role as a child artist. Then in 2005, he appeared in two films: The Flyer and Interrogation Room. In 2013, he was nominated for the Most Popular Actor of the Year Award at the South Africa India Film and Television Awards for his role in the film Lucky Man.

In 2018, he played the role 'Abie Pakkies' in the film Ellen: Die storie van Ellen Pakkies. The film became a blockbuster and received critical acclaim. In 2018, he received the Award for the Best Actor at the Silwerskerm Film Festival for his role. Then in 2019, at the South African Film and Television Awards, he won the SAFTA Golden Horn Award for the Best Actor in a Feature Film for his role in this film. In the same year, he won the Award for the Best Actor in a Supporting Role at 15th Africa Movie Academy Awards.

Filmography

References

External links
 
 Actor Jarrid Geduld books two new roles through IAM

Living people
South African male television actors
1990 births
South African male film actors